Altered Beast, released as  in Japan, is a 2005 action-adventure beat 'em up video game for the PlayStation 2. The game is a remake of the 1988 arcade game Altered Beast. While the gameplay still involves the main character transforming into different kinds of beasts like in the original, the story, characters and setting are completely different, along with notable gameplay additions. The game was released in Europe and Japan in 2005, but was cancelled for North America.

Unlike the original Altered Beast which is set in Ancient Greece, the game features a modern setting unconnected to the previous installments.

Plot

The story follows a man called Luke Custer who is a "Genome-Cyborg", a human whose DNA and other genetic make-up has been artificially altered by micro-chips containing the genetic make-up of other creatures to transform him into an anthropomorphic beast. After surviving a helicopter crash, Luke loses his memory and sets off to learn about the truth behind his past and the Genome-Cyborgs.

Gameplay

The player controls Luke Custer in a third-person perspective as they battle through multiple enemies in close combat to reach the next objective, utilizing the ability to transform into different beasts, each with somewhat of their own element, for a certain amount of time. Unlike the original game, the player can transform in and out of their beast form at will when available. Initially from the start Luke can transform into a werewolf. Further into the game, he finds more Genome-Cyborg DNA chips allowing him to change into even more different kinds of beasts including a Merman, a Garuda, a Wendigo, a Minotaur and a Dragon. While each beast has their own different sets of attacks, they also have abilities that are essential for overcoming obstacles, puzzles and boss fights that hinder progression.

Upon finishing the game, a number of other modes are unlocked including time trial boss fights and a challenge mode that can also unlock further beast forms including a White Weretiger, a Grizzly Bear and an alien-clone U.W.H. (Unidentified Weightless Human).

Reception

The game received mixed reviews with an average critic score of 53/100 at Metacritic. VideoGamer said "The name will probably attract a number of fans of the original game, and they may get the most out of what is an average title. For those who do not base their purchases on nostalgia, look elsewhere." ScrewAttack named Altered Beast as the 10th worst game on their Top 10 Worst 2D to 3D games.

References

External links
  
 Official page at Sega 

2005 video games
PlayStation 2 games
PlayStation 2-only games
Sega beat 'em ups
Werewolf video games
Video games developed in Japan
Video game reboots
Action-adventure games
Single-player video games
Video games about shapeshifting
Video games developed in China